"Mommie Dearest" is the eighth episode of the horror black comedy series Scream Queens. It first aired on November 10, 2015 on Fox. The episode was directed by Michael Uppendahl and written by Ian Brennan. In this episode, Grace (Skyler Samuels) is getting more determined to find out about the bathtub baby identity, believing it to be her, just as the shocking truth is revealed. Dean Munsch (Jamie Lee Curtis) goes psycho after the Red Devils attacked her, and Denise (Niecy Nash) becomes the new house mother for Kappa Kappa Tau. The episode's title is a reference to the film of the same name, released in 1981.

The episode was watched by 2.51 million viewers and received positive reviews from critics.

Plot

Grace (Skyler Samuels) and Cathy Munsch (Jamie Lee Curtis) discuss about the baby in the bathtub incident. Despite making a promise to Grace and Pete to reveal the events of what happened that night in 1995 in exchange for pursuing Feather, Cathy claims she has no memory of ever saying that. She says she was probably high on Klonopin, and so she can't be held accountable for anything she may have said during that time. Cathy also says that because Feather is the killer, the murders have nothing to do with what happened at Kappa 20 years ago, and since Feather has been caught, there's nothing to worry about. Grace is angry that Munsch will not offer up any information, especially since it would greatly help solve who the murderer really is. She tells Cathy that she knows for a fact that Cathy is going to ignore everything that's going on at Wallace University until it personally sneaks up behind her and stabs her in the heart. She then storms out of Cathy's office. That was proven when Cathy is attacked by two Red devils and one more killer dressed as Supreme Court Justice, Antonin Scalia when she was about to take a shower (a remake to the infamous shower scene from the movie Psycho, where Curtis' mother, Janet Leigh stars in the same scene). She fights the 3 of them, and, unable to defeat the Dean, the killers flee.

Since Cathy personally got attacked by the killers, she is now willing to give some information to Grace, just as Grace had predicted. Cathy tells Grace that she hypothetically would be an accessory to homicide if she did in fact witness the death at Kappa in 1995 and proceeded to cover it up. She says that even if she did think the murders were linked to what happened 20 years ago, she couldn't start offering up information to the authorities because she would risk implicating herself. She also says that she thought someone would just shoot the killer and it would all be over with, but now, since they are coming after her, and Wallace University would not survive without her, something needs to be done. She then hands Grace a file that contains the name of the girl who died in the tub. Grace then looks at the name of the bathtub baby's mother - Sophia Doyle (McKaley Miller). She immediately gets confused because she was convinced that she was the bathtub baby, but her mom's last name was Mulligan, according to her dad. Dean Munsch tells Grace that she acts like she's a hero who's trying to solve the murders and bring justice to the campus, but really it's just about her finding out who her mother is. Grace gets angry and says she wants to solve the murders, but she also wants to know if she's the reason why they're happening. Cathy then says to Grace she might have something for her but she's gonna get filthy doing it, and Grace storms out the office.

Back at Kappa house, The Chanels gather evidence they discovered that prove Zayday (Keke Palmer) and Grace are the killers. Hester (Lea Michele) says she found out that Zayday and Grace are on the pill, with synced cycles, just like their thirst for murder. She says that "those who pill together, kill together" and Chanel gets annoyed because that's not even a saying. Next, Chanel #5 (Abigail Breslin) says she knows for a fact that Zayday is the murderer and plans on killing again because the anagram of Zayday Williams is "I MAY SLAY LIZ DAW". She says she has no clue who Liz Daw is, but clearly Zayday is contemplating slaying her. Chanel goes mad since the clues are ridiculous and pays two British detectives to do the job. Chanel #3 (Billie Lourd) discovers that Denise (Niecy Nash) has moved into Kappa House and offers her money to prove that Zayday is the killer. Later, Denise and Jennifer "The Candle Vlogger" (Breezy Eslin) talk about Zayday but get overheard by Zayday, who is mad and warns them to stay away from her. Jennifer is later murdered by the Red Devil when she's hosting her web show. The Chanels and Denise find her body is posed in the dinner table covered in melted wax and surrounded by candles. Jennifer's murder leads Cathy to close the university indefinitely, and a candle light vigil is held for Jennifer.

Grace and Pete (Diego Boneta) discover from the painter in the asylum that Gigi (Nasim Pedrad) is The Hag of Shady Lane and that the Hag took care of two babies, and Grace goes to confront her, only to be shut down. In Kappa House, Chanel asks the two detectives about Zayday and Grace, but instead they find something suspicious on her housemate, Libby Putney. Chanel has no idea who that is, and they tell her she might know Libby as Chanel #5. Chanel states she only wants them to prove that Zayday and Grace are the killers. Then, Grace realizes that Gigi must have known her mom from the bathtub incident, which means Wes must have known Gigi. Grace assumes her dad might have something to do with the murders, so she tells him to stay away from her as she runs out of the house. Grace heads back to Kappa, where Chanel is waiting for her in the living room. She presents Grace with a folder containing her mother's criminal records. It turned out the Grace's mother was Bethany Stevens (Anna Grace Barlow), the ruthless Kappa president in 1995 who refused to help Sophia. She hooked up with Wes and married him before having Grace nine months later. The birth of her daughter caused Bethany to change her name to Mary Mulligan and later was arrested for multiple criminal charges. Wes then sued for custody and won. Mary then died a month later in a fiery car crash while intoxicated. The news causes Grace to slap Chanel and storm out. Wes later confirms it to her. Meanwhile, Chanel is forced to apologize to Grace by Denise, being threatened that if she doesn't apologize, she will steal Chad (Glen Powell) away from her. Chanel later apologizes to Grace, and the two make amends. The episode ends with the return of Boone (Nick Jonas) at the gym, who wears a fake beard and disguises as Joaquin Phoenix. He is on the phone with the Red Devil and states that Gigi is the only thing standing in their way and he plans to get rid of her.

Production
For this episode, Jamie Lee Curtis recreated the infamous shower scene featuring her mother, Janet Leigh from the 1960 film Psycho. Special guest stars returning in this episode include Nick Jonas as Boone Clemens, who faked his death and has been absent since the end of the second episode, Hell Week, and Niecy Nash as Denise Hemphill, the kick-butt but strange security guard. The other recurring characters are Jennifer "Candle Vlogger" (Breezy Eslin), Bethany Stevens (Anna Grace Barlow), who is revealed to be Grace Gardner's mother who changed her name to Mary Mulligan after the events of 1995 flashback incident, Dan Hildebrand as Detective Baxter, and Daniel Donahue as Detective Chiselhurst, the latter two are the British detectives hired by Chanel to prove Zayday and Grace are the killers.

Reception

Ratings
Mommie Dearest was watched live by 2.51 million U.S. viewers and got a 0.9 rating/3 share in the adult 18-49 demographic.

Critical reception
This episode received positive reviews from critics. Terri Schwartz from IGN gave Mommie Dearest a 7.0 citing that "Unless there's some big plot turn coming up, this week's episode highlighted how the relatively simple plot isn't enough to sustain this whole series. But overall "Mommie Dearest" was one of the show's weaker installments." Meryl Gottlieb from The Post Athens gave the episode a positive review; "“Mommie Dearest” was definitely one of the best episodes of the season. Scream Queens still needs to work on finding the best balance between characters. It’s either heavily saturated with someone or that character isn’t featured at all." The A.V. Club's LaToya Ferguson gave the episode C−. She said that "If you’re at home, trying to solve the mystery, then this episode is a necessary one. It’s nothing much overall, but certainly gets the job done better than last week’s return."

References

2015 American television episodes
Scream Queens (2015 TV series) episodes
Television episodes directed by Michael Uppendahl